This is a list of radio stations in South Africa.
M
Note: The list of commercial stations tends to be more stable, with few additions or removals. The list of community stations tends to change quite a bit, with many changes over time (mainly due to funding issues).

National / multiprovincial (commercial stations)

Active
These are the active radio stations in South Africa.
5FM – previously Radio 5
CapeTalk
Kfm 94.5
947 – previously 94.7 Highveld Stereo
99.2 YFM
2000FM (Radio 2000)
Algoa FM (Radio Algoa)
BRFM (The Border Drive)
Capricorn FM
Hot 1027, formerly Classic FM 102.7
East Coast Radio (ECR)
Gagasi FM
Good Hope FM
Heart 104.9 FM
iKwekwezi FM – previously Radio Ndebele
Jacaranda FM
Kaya FM 95.9
Ligwalagwala FM
Lesedi FM
Lotus FM
Metro FM
Motsweding FM
MPowerFM
Munghana Lonene FM
OFM – previously Radio Oranje
Phalaphala FM
Power FM (Power 98.7 FM)
Radio 702
Radiokansel / Radio Pulpit
RSG – previously Afrikaans Stereo, Radio Suid-Afrika (1985), Afrikaanse Diens van die SAUK (1937)
SAfm – previously Radio South Africa (1985), English Service (1936)
Smile 90.4FM
Cybatar Tunes
Thobela FM
tru fm – previously CKI FM
Ukhozi FM
Umhlobo Wenene FM
Vuma 103 FM
YFM99.2
100.6 FM
VUTHA FM COMMERCIAL
VUTHA FM NEWS
EVRH Evogue Radio (Digital radio station)

Ceased

Springbok Radio – owned by SABC; closed 31 December 1985
Radio RSA – closed; renamed Channel Africa after 1992

Free State (community stations)

Active
Koepel Stereo (KSFM 94.9)
Kovsie FM 97.0
Lentswe Community Radio
Mosupatsela FM Stereo
Motheo FM
Overvaal Stereo
QwaQwa Radio
Radio Panorama 107.6 FM
Radio Rosestad 100.6 FM
Setsoto FM Stereo
Central University of Technology Campus Radio (CUT FM 105.8FM)

Gauteng (community stations)

Active
90.6FM Stereo / VCR FM
Hellenic Radio
Hope FM
IFM 102.2
Jozi FM
Kasie FM 97.1
Pretoria FM
Tuks FM 107.2
TUT FM 96.2
UJFM 95.4
Arrowline Chinese Radio AM 1269

KwaZulu-Natal (community stations)

Active
DYR (Durban Youth Radio) 105.1 FM – reactivated as of April 2016
Icora FM (Indonsakusa Community Radio)
KZN Capital 104FM
Ugu Youth Radio FM
[ VOD RADIO 105.4 AM]
[ FAITH ARMARIA ONLINE]

Limpopo (community stations)

Active

Giyani Community Radio
Makhado FM 107.3
John Hagan Radio

Mpumalanga (community stations)

Active
Radio Laeveld 100.5FM Stereo

Northern Cape (community stations)

Active

Kurara FM
Radio NFM 98.1
Radio Orania
Radio Riverside 98.2 FM
Radio Teemaneng Stereo 89.1 FM
Ulwazi FM 88.9
X-K FM 107.9

North West (community stations)

Active

Aganang FM
Letlhabile Community Radio
Lichvaal Stereo (92.6FM)
Life FM
Mafikeng Community Radio 96.7
Modiri FM
PUK FM 93.6
Radio Mafisa 93.4 FM
Star FM 102.9 Mhz
Kopanong FM 100.0 and 103.5 Mhz

Western Cape (Cape Town radio stations)

Active
5FM - Frequency 89.0FM 
Bush Radio 89.5FM 
Smile 90.4FM 
Metro FM 93.0 
HelderbergFM 93.6
Kfm 94.5 
Good Hope FM 95.3FM 
Lotus FM 97.8FM 
Radio 2000 98.6FM 
CCFM 107.5 
Heart 104.9FM 
Fine Music Radio
MFM 92.6
One FM 94.0 
Radio 786 100.4FM 
Radio Kaap se Punt
70vibeFM

Online Radio Stations

Active
 Massiv Metro
 Homegrown Radio
 Chiff Central
 Urban Fusion Radio

Border areas
Botswana
Eswatini – Eswatini Broadcasting and Information Service
Lesotho
Mozambique
LM Radio
Namibia
Zimbabwe

International
93.6 RAM FM
Radio France Internationale – news, sport and features, across Africa

See also

 List of newspapers in South Africa
 Media of South Africa
Lists of radio stations in Africa
Music of South Africa
South African Audience Research Foundation (SAARF)

References

Further reading

External links
Live All Radio Stations From South Africa Online
African radio online
Ecouter Radio En Direct
Listen to all South Africa FM radio stations online 
www.lifefmkzn.co.za
South Africans launch Mideast ‘peace’ radio
Reference lists of community radio by province from South Africa.info
FMLIST database of FM stations (select country "AFS" after logging in or continuing as guest)
FMSCAN reception prediction of FM, TV, MW, SW stations (also use the expert options for better results)
Springbok Radio Preservation Society of South Africa
Radio Station World list of station websites
South African Radio channel
SAARF (South African Audience Research Foundation)
Radio station in South Africa Live Stream

Reference lists of all radio by province from South Africa

 
South Africa
Radio stations